Igor Atrokhov (born 18 January 1960) is a Russian equestrian. He competed in the individual eventing at the 2008 Summer Olympics.

References

1960 births
Living people
Russian male equestrians
Olympic equestrians of Russia
Equestrians at the 2008 Summer Olympics
Sportspeople from Moscow